This list of museums in Surrey, England contains museums which are defined for this context as institutions (including nonprofit organizations, government entities, and private businesses) that collect and care for objects of cultural, artistic, scientific, or historical interest and make their collections or related exhibits available for public viewing. Also included are non-profit art galleries and university art galleries.  Museums that exist only in cyberspace (i.e., virtual museums) are not included.

Defunct museums
 Elmbridge Museum, Elmbridge, website, closed museum site in 2014, offers traveling exhibits and programs, "museum without walls"
 Haxted Watermill, now a brasserie
 Royal Earlswood Museum, Redhill, collections now at the Langdon Down Museum of Learning Disability

See also
:Category:Tourist attractions in Surrey

References

Surrey's Museums

 
Surrey
Museums